Monica Seles was the defending champion, but lost in the semifinals to Eleni Daniilidou.

Anastasia Myskina won in the final, beating Daniilidou 6–3, 0–6, 6–2.

Seeds
The top four seeds received a bye into the second round.

  Jelena Dokić (semifinals)
  Monica Seles (semifinals)
  Anastasia Myskina (champion)
  Patty Schnyder (quarterfinals)
  Iva Majoli (second round)
  Tatiana Panova (first round)
  Nathalie Dechy (second round)
  Eleni Daniilidou (final)

Draw

Finals

Top half

Bottom half

References
 WTA main draw
 ITF tournament details

2002 WTA Tour
2002 Brasil Open